The 2000 All-Big Ten Conference football team consists of American football players chosen as All-Big Ten Conference players for the 2000 NCAA Division I-A football season.  The conference recognizes two official All-Big Ten selectors: (1) the Big Ten conference coaches selected separate offensive and defensive units and named first- and second-team players (the "Coaches" team); and (2) a panel of sports writers and broadcasters covering the Big Ten also selected offensive and defensive units and named first- and second-team players (the "Media" team).

Offensive selections

Quarterbacks
 Drew Brees, Purdue (Coaches-1; Media-1)
 Antwaan Randle El, Indiana (Coaches-2; Media-2)

Running backs
 Damien Anderson, Northwestern (Coaches-1; Media-1)
 Anthony Thomas, Michigan (Coaches-1; Media-1)
 Michael Bennett, Wisconsin (Coaches-2; Media-2)
 T. J. Duckett, Michigan State (Coaches-2; Media-2)

Receivers
 David Terrell, Michigan (Coaches-1; Media-1)
 Vinny Sutherland, Purdue (Coaches-1; Media-2)
 Ron Johnson, Minnesota (Coaches-2; Media-1)
 Chris Chambers, Wisconsin (Coaches-2)
 Kevin Kasper, Iowa (Media-2)

Centers
 Ben Hamilton, Minnesota (Coaches-1; Media-1)
 LeCharles Bentley, Ohio State (Coaches-2; Media-2)

Guards
 Steve Hutchinson, Michigan (Coaches-1; Media-1)
 Casey Rabach, Wisconsin (Coaches-1; Media-1)
 Bill Ferrario, Wisconsin (Coaches-2; Media-2)
 Ray Redziniak, Illinois (Coaches-2)
 Shaun Mason, Michigan State (Media-2)

Tackles
 Jeff Backus, Michigan (Coaches-1; Media-1)
 Matt Light, Purdue (Coaches-1; Media-1)
 Marques Sullivan, Illinois (Coaches-2; Media-2)
 Kareem McKenzie, Penn State (Coaches-2)
 Leon Brockmeier, Northwestern (Media-2)

Tight ends
 Tim Stratton, Purdue (Coaches-1; Media-1)
 Tony Stewart, Penn State (Coaches-2; Media-2)

Defensive selections

Defensive linemen
 Dwayne Missouri, Northwestern (Coaches-1; Media-1)
 Karon Riley, Minnesota (Coaches-1; Media-1)
 Fred Wakefield, Illinois (Coaches-1; Media-1)
 Wendell Bryant, Wisconsin (Coaches-1; Media-2)
 Akin Ayodele, Purdue (Coaches-2; Media-2)
 Justin Kurpeikis, Penn State (Coaches-2; Media-1)
 Matt Mitrione, Purdue (Coaches-2; Media-2)
 John Schlect, Minnesota (Coaches-2)
 Brent Johnson, Ohio State (Coaches-2)

Linebackers
 Josh Thornhill, Michigan State (Coaches-1; Media-1)
 Joe Cooper, Ohio State (Coaches-1; Media-2)
 Larry Foote, Michigan (Coaches-1; Media-2)
 Nick Greisen, Wisconsin (Media-1)
 Billy Silva, Northwestern (Media-1)
 Napoleon Harris, Northwestern (Coaches-2; Media-2)
 Matt Wilhelm, Ohio State (Coaches-2)
 Sean Hoffman, Minnesota (Coaches-2)
 Justin Smith, Indiana (Coaches-2)

Defensive backs
 Nate Clements, Ohio State (Coaches-1; Media-1)
 Jamar Fletcher, Wisconsin (Coaches-1; Media-1)
 Renaldo Hill, Michigan State (Coaches-1; Media-2)
 James Boyd, Penn State (Coaches-2; Media-1)
 Mike Doss, Ohio State (Coaches-2; Media-1)
 Willie Middlebrooks, Minnesota (Coaches-1)
 Mike Echols, Wisconsin (Coaches-2; Media-2)
 Richard Newsome, Michigan State (Coaches-2)
 Harold Blackmon, Northwestern (Media-2)
 Cedric Henry, Michigan State (Media-2)

Special teams

Kickers
 Dan Stultz, Ohio State (Coaches-1; Media-1)
 Dan Nystrom, Minnesota (Coaches-2)
 Tim Long, Northwestern (Media-2)

Punters
 Kevin Stemke, Wisconsin (Coaches-1; Media-1)
 Preston Gruening, Minnesota (Coaches-2; Media-2)

Key
Bold = selected as a first-team player by both the coaches and media panel

Coaches = selected by Big Ten Conference coaches

Media = selected by a media panel

See also
2000 College Football All-America Team

References

All-Big Ten Conference
All-Big Ten Conference football teams